Carlos Alberto Pardo Estévez (September 15, 1975 – June 14, 2009) was a Mexican stock car racing driver from Mexico City. He was the first driver to win the NASCAR Mexico Corona Series championship.

Career
Pardo won 10 of his 74 NASCAR Mexico Corona Series starts and had 8 poles. He won the championship in 2004. He was third in standings in 2005 and 2006. Pardo also competed in six races in the NASCAR Camping World Series East in 2004 and 2005 and raced in the NASCAR Nationwide Series at Autódromo Hermanos Rodriguez in 2006.

Death
Pardo was killed in an accident which occurred on the 97th lap of a 100-lap NASCAR Mexico Corona Series race at Autódromo Miguel E. Abed in Amozoc, Puebla, on June 14, 2009. As Pardo led the field with just four laps remaining, Jorge Goeters attempted to overtake Pardo going into turn 3. Pardo attempted to block Goeters, but came into contact with the front of Goeters' car. Even with water drums (Fitch Barrier) in place to soften any collision, the car disintegrated upon impact. Pardo was transported to a nearby hospital by helicopter, where he was pronounced dead. He was declared the winner of the race as he was leading the race at the last completed lap before the accident occurred, beating Goeters by 0.044 seconds. Pardo, driving for Motorcraft team, had started the race from the last row.

Pardo's brother Rubén also competes in the NASCAR Mexico Corona Series, and finished sixth in the race that his brother won posthumously.

Motorsports career results

NASCAR
(key) (Bold – Pole position awarded by qualifying time. Italics – Pole position earned by points standings or practice time. * – Most laps led.)

Busch Series

Busch East Series

West Series

References

External links
 

1975 births
2009 deaths
Racing drivers from Mexico City
Mexican racing drivers
NASCAR drivers
Sport deaths in Mexico
Filmed deaths in motorsport
Racing drivers who died while racing